Reynisdrangar are basalt sea stacks situated under the mountain Reynisfjall  near the village Vík í Mýrdal in southern Iceland. It is framed by a black sand beach  that was ranked in 1991 as one of the ten most beautiful non-tropical beaches in the world. In 2021 Reynisfjara  was rated the 6th best beach in the world.

Legend 
Legend says that the stacks originated when two trolls dragged a three-masted ship to land unsuccessfully and when daylight broke they became needles of rock.

Contemporary legends note the story of a husband who found his wife taken by the two trolls, frozen at night. The husband made the two trolls swear to never kill anyone ever again. His wife was the love of his life, whose free spirit he was unable to provide a home for; she found her fate out among the trolls, rocks, and sea at Reynisfjara.

In popular culture 
Reynisdrangar appears several times throughout Netflix's Icelandic original series Katla, and is particularly significant to the series' protagonist Gríma as the site of her mother's death.

See also 
 List of places with columnar jointed volcanics#Iceland

References

External links

Beach at Reynisdrangar virtual tour
 - featuring Reynisdrangar

Columnar basalts in Iceland
Stacks of Iceland
Volcanism of Iceland
South Iceland Seismic Zone